Hostile vehicle mitigation (HVM) is a generic term that covers a suite of anti-terrorist protective measures that are often employed around buildings or publicly accessible spaces/venues of particular significance. The design of these various vehicle security barriers and landscape treatments came about as security authorities across the globe sought to mitigate the effects of vehicle borne improvised explosive devices (VBIED). The sorts of places that warrant consideration as potential terrorist targets in need of HVM include: government buildings, airports, large railway stations, sports venues, concentrations of entertainment and crowded night time economy, etc.

Usage
Common types of HVM include locally manufactured barrier systems such as the Jersey Barrier and Bremer T Wall; as well as propriety crash-tested and engineered vehicle bollard systems designed to resist the effects of a vehicle ram attack. HVM can also include adapted hard landscape features, resistive street furniture, sculpture, planters and significant level changes; with a little imagination HVM may be disguised inside architectural features in a street scene.

HVM when installed and fixed correctly is designed to resist hostile vehicle penetration of certain categories of vehicle moving at a range of speeds, these vehicle security barriers undergo various destructive tests carried out by accredited test establishments. The three standards that are generally quoted when specifying HVM performance are:

 ISO IWA 14-1 - an international working agreement
 BSI PAS 68 - the UK standard
 ASTM F2656-07 - the US standard.

These standards set roughly similar criteria for destructive impact testing, although there are differences between the three and vehicle geometries in particular are at the root of some of these differences. HVM barrier selection will be conditioned by a hostile vehicle dynamics study carried out by a suitably qualified security specialist.

Ideally a protective layer of HVM  should surround the building or place being protected and this HVM protection line should be stood off from the building facade or places expected to be crowded. This protective standoff distance is critical in the case of VBIEDs as 'every metre counts' and often distance is one of the best ways to achieve explosive blast effects mitigation.

More recently the focus of HVM has expanded to reduce the potential for vehicle ram attacks directed at crowded events and places. Recent non-VBIED (i.e. vehicle as a weapon) attacks against pedestrians include:

 The 2016 Nice truck attack
 The 2016 Ohio State University attack 
 The 2016 Berlin truck attack
 The 2017 Jerusalem attack 
 The January 2017 Melbourne car attack
 The 2017 Sandy, Utah attack
 The 2017 Stockholm truck attack
 The 2017 Westminster attack
 The 2017 London Bridge attack
 The 2017 Finsbury Park attack

HVM can also be used to protect against ram raids which are invariably criminal attacks against high net-worth targets such as jewelers, cash and valuables in transit depots, bullion storage facilities, art galleries, museums, 'high end' fashion stores, etc.

Correctly installed HVM barrier systems should not adversely affect pedestrian permeability.

See also
 Deaths by car bomb
 Improvised explosive device (IED)
 List of mass car bombings
 Vehicle-ramming attack
 Counter-terrorism
 Security
 Physical security

References

Counterterrorism
Traffic management